Roxana High School is a secondary school in Roxana, Illinois, United States. The school's mascot is the shell, named for the former Shell Oil (now ConocoPhillips) refinery also located in the town. The school district encompasses all of Roxana, South Roxana, and parts of Wood River, Edwardsville and Rosewood Heights.

1802-1989
The area around Roxana began offering education in 1802 with the construction of Gilham's Pasture School on the northeast corner of what is now 13th Street and Edwardsville Road in Wood River, the current site of a Dairy Queen. Other general schools opened and closed throughout the late nineteenth century and early twentieth century; these include Brushy Grove School (not to be confused with its later incarnation, Brushey Grove School) from 1858 to 1969, Roxana School from 1918 to 1926, Edison School from 1926 to 1936, and Burbank School starting in 1936. Burbank was built as a WPA project, and was named after botanist Luther Burbank.

The school district did not have a secondary school at that time; Roxana students went to other districts for their education instead, primarily Wood River High School, which had opened in 1925. In 1939, citizens of Roxana and part of neighboring Wood River voted to form a new school district; the high school itself was built in 1941 and has been added to throughout its tenure.

The original building had three stories, comprising twelve classrooms, a main office, a library, and a gymnasium. A larger gym was added in 1954.

Throughout the 1960s and 1970s, the district included four elementary schools: Central, Rosewood Heights, Burbank and South Roxana. Roxana Junior High School was built adjacent to the high school; today, they are one contiguous building. Central, Rosewood, South Roxana, and the Junior High buildings were all constructed simultaneously with the 1954 erection of the large gymnasium at the high school.

Brushey Grove School was sold at public auction in 1971. A US Bank now stands on the spot previously occupied by Brushey Grove School, and a commemorative marker can be found in its parking lot noting the existence of the old school.

Roxana School was located on Edwardsville Road in Roxana, between Walnut and Tydeman, facing the Standard Oil Refinery fence. After its demolition, the land was sold to a trucking company, and it has been used for that purpose since at least 1970.

Edison School was located at the southwest corner of Tydeman and Central Avenue in Roxana, directly across the street from the First Baptist Church of Roxana. After Edison's demolition in the late 1960s, Roxana Public Library was built on the site in 1970.

Burbank added an addition in 1966. However, as enrollment began to decline with the passage of the post-war baby boom, schools began closing. Burbank, the oldest of the four, closed in 1983 and was sold to a local chiropractor. The building was given to the city and razed in 2009.

Rosewood Heights School followed in 1989, and the building has since been razed. Following the closure of these two schools, sixth graders were moved to the junior high building, and the remaining two grade schools (Central School and South Roxana School) now service grades Pre-K through 5.

2011-present

RHS has grown considerably from its beginnings; the school now contains over twenty-five full classrooms, two gyms, an auditorium, a cafeteria, a weight room, a baseball field, a football field, an All-weather running track, six tennis courts, a full bus garage, three on campus parking lots, and entire buildings dedicated to science, family and consumer sciences, technology, and automotive education. A junior high school and the school district's administrative offices also adjoin the high school building. In 2011 construction finished on the new larger cafeteria, track, and parking lot. The cafeteria is a completely new building built near the bus garage on campus (it has since retired the former cafeteria.) The new track was built in place of the former cinder track RHS offered. The new parking lot was created behind the football field's home-team bleachers, adding about 70 new parking spaces free of charge for students.

On April 1, 2014, the school went into a major lockdown. A student had sent a fake text saying that shots had been fired. This later turned out to be a false statement.

Athletics
RHS is a part of the Illinois High School Association, participating in 10 out of 14 sports offered for boys and 10 out of 14 sports offered for girls.

Other extracurricular organizations
 Student Council
 Business Network
 Mock Trial
 Weight Lifting
 Art Club
 German Club
 History Club
 FCCLA
 Yearbook Club
 National Honor Society
 Pep Club
 "R" Club (for lettermen)
 SADD
 Spanish Club
 The Roxettes (a dance team)
 Thespians
 Chorus
 Honors Choral Ensemble
 The Treble Makers [A girls ensemble]
 Science Olympiad
 Concert Band
 Jazz Band
 Scholar Bowl
 Tri-M
Started in the 2005–2006 school year, RHS's Tri-M chapter celebrates over 30 scholar musicians in its current membership.

Notable alumni
Harry Gallatin - Basketball player, coach; Basketball Hall of Fame member.
Kristine Wylie, Phd. - Co-author of research paper on ViroCap virus test. , "Enhanced virome sequencing using targeted sequence capture". Genome Research, online September 22, 2015
Todd Wylie - Co-author of research paper on ViroCap virus test. , "Enhanced virome sequencing using targeted sequence capture". Genome Research, online September 22, 2015

References

Educational institutions established in 1941
Public high schools in Illinois
Schools in Madison County, Illinois
1941 establishments in Illinois